This is a list compiling Irish folk songs and Irish artists who produced them, between the years of 1960 and 1969, inclusive.

Births and deaths

Births
 Enya (1961)
 Ronan Hardiman (1961)
 Michael McGlynn (1964)
 Sinéad O'Connor (1966)
 Susan McKeown (1967)
 Sharon Shannon (1967)

Recordings
 1961- "Clancy Brothers and Tommy Makem" (The Clancy Brothers & Tommy Makem)
 1963- 1st Chieftains album
 1964- "The Dubliners" (Dubliners)
 1965- "The Bunch of Keys" (Felix Doran)
 1966- "We're Off to the Dublin Green" (Abbey Tavern Singers)
 1967- "A Drop of the Hard Stuff" (Dubliners)
 1968- "Astral Weeks" (Van Morrison)

References

1960